Tameza is one of two parishes (administrative divisions) in Yernes y Tameza, a municipality within the province and autonomous community of Asturias, in northern Spain. 

The time zone is UTC+1(+2DT).

Villages and hamlets
 Villabre (municipal capital)
 Fojó (Fuxóu)
 Villarruíz (Villuarrí)

Natural wonders
 Caldoveiro Peak

References

Parishes in Yernes y Tameza